The Polk County Courthouse and 1905 Courthouse Annex is historical site located in Livingston, Polk County, Texas, USA.

The annex was built in 1900 and remained significant until 1974, and was designed for governmental uses. The architects Green, Lewis Sterling McLelland and Fink designed the structure with a classical/revival design. In 2001, it was added to the National Register of Historic Places.

See also

National Register of Historic Places listings in Polk County, Texas

References

Polk County, Texas
Polk County
Buildings and structures in Polk County, Texas